I Loved You Wednesday is a 1933 American pre-Code comedy drama film directed by Henry King and William Cameron Menzies and written by Philip Klein and Horace Jackson, adapted from the 1932 play of the same title by Molly Ricardel and William DuBois. The film stars Warner Baxter, Elissa Landi, Victor Jory, Miriam Jordan, Laura Hope Crews, and June Lang. The film was released on June 16, 1933, by Fox Film Corporation.

Synopsis
Vicki Meredith, a ballet student in Paris, meets and falls for fellow American and aspiring architect Randall Williams. Some time into their relationship she discovers he already has a wife back home. Angered by this she abandons Paris and heads for South America where she meets engineer Philip Fletcher, and falls in love before he then leaves to work on the Boulder Dam. In America she encounters Philip again as well as Randall and his wife.

Cast        
Warner Baxter as Philip Fletcher
Elissa Landi as Vicki Meredith
Victor Jory as Randall Williams
Miriam Jordan as Cynthia Williams
Laura Hope Crews as Doc Mary Hanson
June Lang as Ballet Dancer
 Anne Nagel as 	Ruby - the Hat Check Girl
 Chris-Pin Martin as Chris - the Waiter 
 Gino Corrado as Opera Singing Neighbor 
 Ethan Laidlaw as Signalman
 Mischa Auer as Piano Accompanist 
 Alphonse Martell as 	Bickering Frenchman 
 Charles R. Moore as Elevator Operator
 Bull Montana as 	Doorman at Speakeasy

References

External links 
 

1933 films
1930s English-language films
Fox Film films
American comedy films
1933 comedy films
Films directed by Henry King
Films directed by William Cameron Menzies
American black-and-white films
1930s American films
Films set in Paris
Films set in South America
Films set in New York City
American films based on plays